IASFM may refer to:

 The International Association for the Study of Forced Migration
 Isaac Asimov's Science Fiction Magazine